is a 1966 Japanese drama and crime film directed by Nagisa Ōshima.

Plot
After housemaid Shino is attacked and tied up and her employer raped and murdered, it turns out that Shino and the intruder, serial killer Eisuke, are from the same rural village. Shino pretends not to be sure about Eisuke's identity and, with the police on her track, travels to Osaka to meet Mrs. Kura, Eisuke's wife. In a series of flashbacks it is revealed that Shino, the sole survivor of a shinjū with her lover Genji, was raped afterwards by Eisuke while being unconscious. Village teacher Kura, Genji's former lover, married Eisuke despite her knowledge of his deed, and kept his identity a secret although she knew of his crimes. Back in the present, Shino convinces Kura to turn Eisuke over to the police. After his death sentence, Kura talks Shino into committing suicide with her, which she regards as the last logical act. Kura dies, and Shino is again the sole survivor of a double suicide attempt.

Cast
Kei Satō as Eisuke Oyamada
Saeda Kawaguchi as Shino Shinozaki
Akiko Koyama as Matsuko Kura
Rokkō Toura as Genji Hyuga
Fumio Watanabe as Detective Haraguchi
Taiji Tonoyama as Principal

Production
Consisting of over 2,000 single shots, Violence at Noon was once considered the most highly edited work in Japanese film history.

References

External links
 
 
 

1966 films
1966 drama films
Japanese drama films
Japanese black-and-white films
Films based on works by Japanese writers
Films directed by Nagisa Ōshima
1960s Japanese films